Ancylolomia perfasciata is a species of moth in the family Crambidae. This species is known from eastern and southern Africa (Ethiopia, Kenya, Zimbabwe, Uganda and South Africa) and from Madagascar.

Its wingspan is 32–42 mm.

References

Moths described in 1919
Ancylolomia
Moths of Africa
Moths of Madagascar